Cernuella is a genus of small air-breathing land snails, pulmonate gastropod mollusks in the family Geomitridae, the hairy snails and their allies. 

The native range of the genus is primarily Mediterranean.

Some species such as Cernuella virgata have become significant invasive species, agricultural pests, in parts of Australia.

This same species of the genus has been recovered in archaeological excavations from the Roman Empire occupation of Volubilis, an ancient habitation site in present-day Morocco.

Cernuella snails create and use love darts as part of their courtship and mating behavior.

Species 
Species within the genus Cernuella include:
 Cernuella aginnica (Locard, 1882)
 Cernuella amanda (Rossmässler, 1838)
 Cernuella aradasii (Pirajno, 1842)
 Cernuella caruanae (Kobelt, 1888) 
 Cernuella cisalpina (Rossmässler, 1837)
 Cernuella hydruntina (Kobelt, 1883)
 Cernuella jonica (Mousson, 1854)
 Cernuella lampedusae (Kobelt, 1890)
 Cernuella neglecta (Draparnaud, 1805)
 † Cernuella palaeocastrensis (De Stefani in De Stefani et al., 1891) 
 Cernuella rugosa (Lamarck, 1822)
 Cernuella selmaniana Brandt, 1959
 Cernuella tineana (Benoit, 1862)
 Cernuella virgata (Da Costa, 1778)
Synonyms
 Cernuella dobrogica Grossu, 1983: synonym of Cernuella cisalpina (Rossmässler, 1837) (junior synonym) 
 Cernuella metabola (Westerlund, 1889): synonym of Theba pisana (O. F. Müller, 1774) (junior synonym)
 Cernuella zilchi Brandt, 1959: synonym of Alteniella zilchi (Brandt, 1959) (original

References

 Monterosato, T. A. di. (1892). Molluschi terrestri delle isole adiacenti alla Sicilia. Atti della Reale Accademia di Scienze, Lettere e Belle Arti di Palermo, Terza Serie. 3 (2): 1-34. Palermo.
 Bank, R. A. (2017). Classification of the Recent terrestrial Gastropoda of the World. Last update: July 16th, 2017.

External links
 Schlüter, F. (1838). Kurzgefasstes systematisches Verzeichniss meiner Conchyliensammlung nebst Andeutung aller bis jetzt von mir bei Halle gefundenen Land- und Flussconchylien. Gebauersche Buchdruckerei, Halle. vii + 40 pp
 Gude, G. K. & Woodward, B. B. (1921). On Helicella, Férussac. Proceedings of the Malacological Society of London. 14 (5/6): 174-190. London 

Geomitridae
Gastropod genera